Kizito Musampa (born 20 July 1977) is a former professional footballer who played as a left winger.

Musampa had a journeyman career, taking in notable spells at AFC Ajax, Bordeaux, Malaga CF, Atlético Madrid and Manchester City. Born Zaire, he earned 28 caps representing the Netherlands at under-20 and under-21 levels. He was well known for his pace and free-kicks.

Club career

Ajax and Bordeaux
Born in Kinshasa, Zaire, now the Democratic Republic of the Congo, Musampa first started off in the famous AFC Ajax youth academy where he played a total of 31 games in two seasons and scored six goals. Which a goal scored against NAC Breda, was the first Ajax goal in the new stadium, the Johan Cruyff Arena. He subsequently signed on for Girondins Bordeaux in 1997 to further his experience in the hope to be selected for the Netherlands national team competing in the 1998 FIFA World Cup although he was overlooked by then coach Guus Hiddink.

Málaga and Atlético
After spending two seasons at the French club, he decided to move on to Spanish club Málaga CF where he played 94 games and scored a total of 22 goals in four seasons. In 2003, he was transferred to Atlético Madrid for €3 million on a five-year contract, a year before his Málaga contract was due to expire, in what he viewed as a potentially good career move. In his first season with the club, he played 26 matches and scored two goals although in the following season, he was relegated to the substitutes' bench and only scraped together eight games in 2004.

Manchester City
In January 2005, Musampa moved to Manchester City of the Premier League on loan after becoming a fringe player at Atlético. In his first six months, he scored three goals in 14 games; his first City goal was a "spectacular volley" in the last-minute which was the winner against Liverpool and gave Stuart Pearce his first win as City manager, while he also scored goals against Aston Villa in a 2-1 victory, and an equaliser against Middlesbrough which wasn't enough to help City qualify for the 2005–06 UEFA Cup.

In June 2005 Musampa agreed up to stay at Manchester City for a second season. The Dutchman started the new season as a regular first team player, but lost his first team place in December, after which he played irregularly, with the majority of his appearances being in central midfield. At the end of the 2005–06 season he returned to Atlético.

Trabzonspor and AZ
On 30 August 2006, Musampa signed a three-year contract for Turkish club Trabzonspor on a free transfer.

After being released from Trabzonspor, Musampa trained with English Premiership side Sunderland for a period but ultimately was not signed by the club. After returning to the Netherlands, Musampa trained with Eredivisie outfit AZ. In November 2007, he signed a contract at the club for the rest of the season, but he was released from his contract on 1 January 2008.

FC Seoul
After an unsuccessful trial with Toronto FC of Major League Soccer he signed a two-year contract with K-League side FC Seoul in March 2008. His stay in South Korea was brief, as he made just three league appearances and two League Cup appearances for the club before the two parties agreed to mutually terminate his contract in June 2008.

Willem II
On 14 March 2009, Musampa returned to professional football signing for Willem II Tilburg in the Netherlands.

Metz
In September 2009 the winger went on trial with French side FC Metz, scored one goal in a friendly match, but the club did not sign him in the end.

He eventually announced his retirement from professional football.

International career
Musampa was a member of the Netherlands U20 team at the 1995 FIFA World Youth Championship, playing all three group matches, the team did not proceed past the group stage. Musampa went on to be a key player for the Netherlands Under-21s and achieved 25 caps, scoring 8 goals, he is currently in the top 10 players for both caps and goals at that level. His form whilst on loan at Manchester City earned him a call-up to the Netherlands squad to play Romania and Finland but he played in neither game.

Honours
Ajax
 Intercontinental Cup: 1995 
 UEFA Champions League: 1994-95
 UEFA Super Cup: 1995
 Eredivisie: 1994–95, 1995-96
 Dutch Supercup: 1995

Bordeaux
 Division 1: 1998-99

Málaga
 UEFA Intertoto Cup: 2002

References

External links

Netherlands profile at OnsOranje

1977 births
Living people
Association football wingers
Dutch footballers
Dutch expatriate footballers
AFC Ajax players
FC Girondins de Bordeaux players
Málaga CF players
Atlético Madrid footballers
Manchester City F.C. players
Trabzonspor footballers
AZ Alkmaar players
FC Seoul players
Willem II (football club) players
Eredivisie players
Ligue 1 players
La Liga players
Premier League players
Süper Lig players
K League 1 players
Expatriate footballers in France
Expatriate footballers in Spain
Expatriate footballers in England
Expatriate footballers in Turkey
Expatriate footballers in South Korea
Footballers from Kinshasa
Dutch expatriate sportspeople in France
Dutch expatriate sportspeople in Spain
Dutch expatriate sportspeople in England
Dutch expatriate sportspeople in Turkey
Dutch expatriate sportspeople in South Korea
Democratic Republic of the Congo emigrants to the Netherlands
Netherlands youth international footballers
Netherlands under-21 international footballers
AFC Ajax non-playing staff